Peter M. Simons,  (born 23 March 1950) is a British philosopher and a retired professor of philosophy at Trinity College Dublin. He is known for his work with Kevin Mulligan and Barry Smith on metaphysics and the history of Austrian philosophy. Since 2018 he is Visiting Professor at the University of Italian Switzerland.

Biography
Simons studied at the University of Manchester, and has held teaching posts at the University of Bolton, from which he holds an honorary doctorate, the University of Salzburg, where he is Honorary Professor of Philosophy, and the University of Leeds. He has been President of the European Society for Analytic Philosophy and is current director of the Franz Brentano Foundation.

His research interests include metaphysics and ontology, the history of logic, the history of Central European Philosophy, particularly in Austria and Poland in the 19th and 20th centuries, and the application of metaphysics to engineering and other non-philosophical disciplines. He is the author or co-author of five books and over 290 articles.

Awards 
 FBA: Fellow of the British Academy (elected July 2004)
 Member of Academia Europaea (elected 2006)
 Member of the Royal Irish Academy (elected 2013)
 Foreign Member of the Polish Academy of Sciences (elected 2018)

Publications 
 Parts. A Study In Ontology, Oxford: Clarendon Press, 1987.
 Philosophy and Logic in Central Europe from Bolzano to Tarski. Selected Essays, Dordrecht: Kluwer, 1992.

References

External links
Website of the Department of Philosophy at Trinity College
Personal webpage
Website of the European Society for Analytic Philosophy

1950 births
Living people
20th-century British philosophers
21st-century British philosophers
Fellows of the British Academy
Alumni of the University of Manchester
Academics of Trinity College Dublin
Academics of the University of Bolton
Members of Academia Europaea
University of Salzburg alumni
Metaphysicians
Ontologists
Analytic philosophers